Åke Yngve Valdemar Viebke (13 January 1912 – 29 December 1988) was a Swedish horse rider. He competed in the individual mixed dressage at the 1960 Summer Olympics and placed ninth.

References

1912 births
1988 deaths
Olympic equestrians of Sweden
Swedish male equestrians
Swedish dressage riders
Equestrians at the 1960 Summer Olympics
People from Ängelholm Municipality